Blakeman Bridge is an arch bridge which crosses the Embarras River in Coles County, Illinois. The Mercantile Bridge Company built the bridge in 1907. The bridge spanned the river at the site of the first mill and settlement in Coles County.

The bridge was added to the National Register of Historic Places on November 30, 1981.

References

Road bridges on the National Register of Historic Places in Illinois
Bridges completed in 1907
Bridges in Coles County, Illinois
Arch bridges in the United States
National Register of Historic Places in Coles County, Illinois
Concrete bridges in the United States